Mars is a surname. Notable people with the surname include:

 Mademoiselle Mars, stage name of French actress Anne Salvetat (1779–1847)
Adam Mars (born 1981), American artist
 Alastair Mars (1915–1985), British World War II submarine commander and author
 Alexandre Mars (born 1976), French businessman and philanthropist
 Betty Mars (1944–1989), French singer and actress
 Bruno Mars (born 1985), American singer-songwriter
 Chris Mars, American musician and painter
 Dwayne Mars (born 1989), Barbadian footballer
 Ed Mars (1866–1941), American baseball player
 Ethel V. Mars (1884–1945), American businesswoman and racehorse owner
 Florence Mars (1923–2006), American civil rights activist and author 
 Forrest Mars, Sr. (1904–1999), American confectionery magnate
Forrest Mars, Jr. (1931–2016), American confectionery magnate, son of the above
 Franklin Clarence Mars (1883–1934), American confectionery magnate
 Gerald Mars (born 1933), British social anthropologist
 Hans-Joachim Mars (born 1926), German sports shooter
 Jacqueline Mars (born 1939), American confectionery magnate
 James Mars (1790–1880), American slave narrative author
 James C. Mars (1876–1944), American aviation pioneer
 John Mars, Canadian singer, songwriter, and percussionist
 John Franklyn Mars (born 1935), American confectionery magnate
 Johnny Mars (born 1942), American harmonica player, singer, and songwriter
 Kenneth Mars (1935–2011), American actor
 Kettly Mars (born 1958), Haitian poet and novelist
 Marijke Mars (born 1965), American billionaire heiress and businesswoman
 Melissa Mars (born 1979), French singer and actress
 Mick Mars, American lead guitarist for Mötley Crüe
 Natalie Mars (born 1984), American pornographic actress
 Roman Mars, American podcaster

See also
  for fictional characters surnamed Mars
 Commander Mars (disambiguation)